Jakob Hudson Nacken or Jacob Nacken (15 February 1906  29 March 1987) was a German circus performer active in Europe and the United States. He began his career as an exceptionally tall person while a teenager, performing in a traveling circus, and appeared in the 1939 New York World's Fair. He was employed as a giant Santa Claus and appeared on American television as a figure of high stature and in freak shows as the World's Tallest Man.

Early life 
Nacken was born in Düsseldorf, Germany, on 15 February 1906.

Mid-life and career
Nacken began his career in show business performing as "Uranus" and the "giant from the Rhineland" in a German traveling circus. He was called Germany's tallest man and was credited as being the world's tallest man at the time. Nacken wore size 17 boots as an adult. He had bruises on his head from hitting the tops of doorways that were built to accommodate people of normal height.

He appeared at Luna Park, an amusement park in Paris, in 1922.

He returned to Germany at the beginning of World War II and was immediately drafted into the army, becoming their tallest soldier on record. Nacken was put into a gun crew with 250 soldiers who were captured at Calais, France, in August 1944.  Nacken and his men were taken to England as prisoners of war and remained there until the end of the war.

In August 1949, newspapers announced Nacken was to return to the United States because he wanted to leave post-war Germany. Nacken's sister, who already lived  in the United States, prepared a place for him and his wife to live in Paterson, New Jersey. Nacken and his wife emigrated to the United States on the SS Atlantic from Genoa, Italy, arriving in the port of New York City on 6 December 1950.

Nacken sought work that would suit his stature. Through newspaper pictures and Pathé newsreels, he was well-known. During December 1949, he worked as Santa Claus. Children were able to walk between his legs and he was dubbed the world's tallest Santa. Nacken worked in Ripley's Believe It or Not! shows as the "World's Tallest Man". He appeared on several television shows as a celebrity known as "Germany's Long Jake".

Personal life 
On 10 August 1927, Nacken married Maria from Kematen an der Ybbs, Austria, in Brussels, Belgium.

He became a citizen of the United States on 16 December 1955.

Later life and death 
Nacken's last appearance as "World's Tallest Man" was in 1959 at Ripley's Odditorium on Broadway in Manhattan, New York City. He died in Europe at age 81.

Gallery

See also 

Ella Ewing
List of tallest people
Robert Wadlow

References

1906 births
1987 deaths
People from Düsseldorf
German Army soldiers of World War II
People with acquired American citizenship
American circus performers
German circus performers
German emigrants to the United States
German prisoners of war in World War II held by the United Kingdom